Darren Agonistes Cross is a fictional supervillain appearing in American comic books published by Marvel Comics. He is the archenemy of Scott Lang (the second superhero to be called Ant-Man), and the cousin of Crossfire.

In the Marvel Cinematic Universe, the character was portrayed in live-action by Corey Stoll in the 2015 film Ant-Man as Yellowjacket (a concept later integrated into the comics with the character as the third version of Yellowjacket in the Marvel Universe), and in the 2023 film Ant-Man and the Wasp: Quantumania as M.O.D.O.K.

Publication history
Darren Cross debuted in Marvel Premiere #47 (April 1979), and was created by John Byrne and David Michelinie. The character made his first appearance as Yellowjacket in The Astonishing Ant-Man #12 (September 2016), which was written by Nick Spencer and illustrated by Brent Shoonover.

Fictional character biography
Darren Cross is a millionaire and the founder of a successful corporation, which rivals top competitors. He is the first cousin of Crossfire, and the father of Augustine Cross. 

Cross was diagnosed with a heart condition due to overwork, and had to use an experimental nucleorganic pacemaker in order to save his life. The pacemaker was a success but enhanced Cross's circulatory system, mutating his body and giving him superhuman abilities. With a side effect that overuse causes the burning out of his heart, Cross went through various heart transplants, which led him to capture surgeon Dr. Erica Sondheim to replace his heart and to abduct "donors" from the slums. This attracted Scott Lang's attention of the second Ant-Man looking for Sondheim in order to save his own daughter's life. The resulting battle with Lang burned out Cross's heart, as Sondheim had reimplanted his old, worn-out heart prior to Lang crashing the surgery.

Darren's body is later revealed to have been kept in a cryonic state as Augustine was obsessed with bringing Darren back to life and eventually forces Dr. Sondheim to help. Augustine enlisted Crossfire's to orchestrate Cassie Lang's capture as the girl's heart is required to withstand the unique conditions when transplanted into Darren. While infiltrating Cross's company to rescue Cassie, Ant-Man came across his nemesis. Darren engages in combat against Ant-Man who buys time for Sondheim to transplant another heart to Cassie. Darren is ultimately forced to flee with his son when the Pym Particles now in his body cause him to shrink down.

As part of the "All-New, All-Different Marvel", Darren Cross is later approached by Power Broker to demonstrate his latest "Hench" App by hiring someone to kill Ant-Man. However, Cross is unwilling to give Power Broker the 1.2 billion dollars demanded for investment in the Hench app, causing Power Broker to cancel the demo and cancel Whirlwind's assassination on Ant-Man.

Cross later represents his own company when he attends a meeting at the Universal Bank with Tiberius Stone of Alchemax, Wilson Fisk of Fisk Industries, Sebastian Shaw of Shaw Industries, Zeke Stane of Stane International, Frr'dox of Shi'ar Solutions Consolidated, and Wilhelmina Kensington of Kilgore Arms where they discuss Dario Agger's and Roxxon Energy Corporation's plans to exploit the Ten Realms of Asgard. Cross also sees the arrival of Exterminatrix of the Midas Foundation who knocks out Dario and declares herself a new member of their assembly.

In order to combat Ant-Man, Cross recruits Egghead to work for his company to help Cross control his Pym Particle abilities with the Yellowjacket battlesuit. Yellowjacket, Egghead and Crossfire attack during his nemesis's trial in Cassie's place, but are engaged by Ant-Man, She-Hulk, Miss Thing, Grizzly, Machinesmith and Stinger. Yellowjacket is defeated by Stinger, which leads to Peggy Rae's final approval of Lang's superhero life and acquittal in court.

During the "Opening Salvo" part of the "Secret Empire" storyline, Yellowjacket appears as a member of Baron Helmut Zemo's Army of Evil.

During the "Hunted" storyline, Yellowjacket is among the animal-themed characters that were captured by Taskmaster and Black Ant for Kraven the Hunter's Great Hunt that was sponsored by Arcade's company Arcade Industries. When the Great Hunt is over, Yellowjacket finds Black Ant in the bushes as he, Human Fly, Razorback, Toad, and White Rabbit plan to take revenge on him.

Cross would join the Hellfire Club on an assault on Krakoa.

Powers and abilities
Darren Cross possesses a keen scientific mind and is a successful businessman. The experimental nucleorganic pacemaker that saved Cross from his heart condition also granted him superhuman abilities such as enhanced physical attributes, increased sensory perception, and a regenerative healing factor. After acquiring a Pym Particle-equipped heart during a heart transplant, Cross gained near uncontrollable size-shifting abilities; he is at risk of growing when angered and shrinking when calm. The Yellowjacket battlesuit helps Cross control his Pym Particle quantum powers. The Yellowjacket battlesuit grants Cross enhanced durability and flight, in addition to featuring "stingers" that can discharge powerful blasts of bio-electrical energy.

In other media

Television
The Darren Cross incarnation of Yellowjacket appears in Ant-Man (2017), voiced by William Salyers.

Film

 The Darren Cross incarnation of Yellowjacket appears in Lego Marvel Super Heroes: Avengers Reassembled, voiced by Travis Willingham.
 Darren Cross appears in films set in the Marvel Cinematic Universe (MCU), portrayed by Corey Stoll.
 Cross first appears in Ant-Man (2015) as Yellowjacket. Stoll wore a motion capture suit while performing as Yellowjacket, a decision that was made early on after the production team learned that creating and filming with a real Yellowjacket costume would be impractical. This version is Hank Pym's former protégé who becomes obsessed with Pym's particle shrinking technology. However, Pym refuses to divulge his secrets out of fear of warfare, so Cross forces his mentor out of Pym Technologies, takes over as the company's new CEO which is converted into Cross Technologies. Despite possessing initially imperfect shrinking technology that, as a result, slowly altered his brain chemistry to the point of making him insane, Cross manages to duplicate the Ant-Man suit designs and create his own weaponized "Yellowjacket" suit. He seeks to sell the Yellowjacket prototype to HYDRA and the Ten Rings, prompting Pym to recruit Scott Lang as the new Ant-Man so the two of them and Pym's daughter Hope van Dyne could intervene. While Cross anticipates their plan and nearly captures them, they succeed in destroying Pym Technologies and Cross' resources. With his plans ruined, Cross lividly dons the Yellowjacket suit himself to fight Lang until the latter shrinks to a size small enough to disrupt the Yellowjacket's internal mainframe, causing Cross to shrink uncontrollably and disappear.
 Cross appears in Ant-Man and the Wasp: Quantumania (2023) as M.O.D.O.K. (Mechanized Organism Designed Only for Killing) due to the uncontrolled shrinking and aligned himself with Kang the Conqueror. After Cassie Lang appeals to his better nature, Cross betrays Kang and gives his life to stop his former master.

Video games
 Darren Cross / Yellowjacket appears as a playable character in Marvel: Contest of Champions.
 Darren Cross / Yellowjacket appears as a playable character in Marvel: Future Fight.
 Darren Cross / Yellowjacket appears as a DLC playable character in Lego Marvel's Avengers.
 Darren Cross / Yellowjacket appears in Marvel Avengers Academy.
 Darren Cross / Yellowjacket appears as a playable character in Marvel Puzzle Quest.
 Darren Cross / Yellowjacket appears in Marvel Snap.

Merchandise
Darren Cross / Yellowjacket, based on the MCU incarnation, received a figure as part of GameStop-exclusive two-pack alongside Ant-Man in Hasbro's Marvel Studios: The First Ten Years Legends Series.

References

External links
 Darren Cross at Marvel Wiki
 Darren Cross at Comic Vine

Marvel Comics supervillains
Characters created by David Michelinie
Characters created by John Byrne (comics)
Comics characters introduced in 1979
Superhero film characters
Fictional business executives
Fictional characters who can change size
Fictional mad scientists
Fictional mass murderers
Marvel Comics male supervillains
Marvel Comics mutates
Marvel Comics characters with accelerated healing
Marvel Comics scientists